Bárbara Heliodora Guilhiermina da Silveira (São João del-Rei, c. 1759 – São Gonçalo do Sapucaí, May 24, 1819) was a Brazilian poet, gold miner and political activist.

Family 
Her parents were José da Silveira e Sousa and Maria Josefa Bueno da Cunha. For some scholars, she was descended from one of the most illustrious families in São Paulo: Amador Bueno, the acclaimed one.

Marriage 
She was married to Inconfidente Alvarenga Peixoto. In fact, Alvarenga Peixoto and Bárbara Heliodora lived together for some time, and only married, by the ordinance of the Bishop of Mariana, on December 22, 1781, when Maria Iphigenia, the couple's daughter, was already three years old. Three more children were born from this union: Jose Eleuterio, Joao Damasceno (who would later be called Joao Evangelista) and Tristao Antônio. By virtue of her marriage to Alvarenga, and her instant participation in the Inconfidente movement, Barbara won the title of "Heroine of Inconfidência of Minas Gerais". She lost Maria Ifigênia, her eldest daughter, when she was still 13 years old, and had suffered a violent horse fall that had caused her death, due to the return journey from Campanha da Princesa to São Gonçalo do Sapucaí.

References 

1759 births
1819 deaths
People from São João del-Rei
Brazilian poets